Edward D. Manuel (born ?) is an American politician and current Chairman who previously served the post of the Tohono O'odham nation of southern Arizona from 1995 until 2003. He is from Pisinemo, Arizona.

Manuel was elected and took office as Chairman of the Tohono O'odham in 1995. He was re-elected for a second term in 1999, defeating challenger Vivian Juan-Saunders and her running mate, Ned Norris, Jr.

Manuel, who was seeking a third term as Chairman, was defeated for re-election in May 34, 2003, in a rematch with Vivian Juan-Saunders. Juan-Saunders won 59% of the vote and eight of the eleven electoral districts in the 2003 election.

In May 2015, after serving two years as a Legislative representative, along with running mate Verlon Jose, Manuel was elected to a third term as Chairman by 213 votes over incumbent Ned Norris, Jr.

References

Chairmen of the Tohono O'odham
Native American leaders
Arizona politicians
People from Pima County, Arizona
Living people
Year of birth missing (living people)
Native American people from Arizona